Rossville is an unincorporated community in Allamakee County, Iowa, United States.

History
 Rossville was platted in 1855. It is named for William F. Ross, said to be the first settler on the townsite in 1850. By the 1880s, Rossville contained three churches, a schoolhouse, hotel, and two stores.

Notes

Unincorporated communities in Allamakee County, Iowa
Unincorporated communities in Iowa
1855 establishments in Iowa
Populated places established in 1855